Bir al-Helou is a town in central al-Hasakah Governorate, northeastern Syria. It is administrative center of the Nahiya Bir al-Helou al-Wardiya consisting of 72 municipalities.

At the 2004 census, Bir al-Helou had a population of 3,718.

References

Towns in Syria